This is a list of VK-designated tanks made by Germany from 1930s until 1945.

The name
The Versuchskampffahrzeug (abbreviated to VK or Vs.Kfz.) is a German term meaning "research/experimental fighting vehicle". Used in the names of some German experimental or prototype tanks produced before and during World War II. The "VK" term was also referred to as "Vollketten" (meaning "fully tracked").

Designation
The designation layout was VK XX.XX (X). For example, the VK 30.01 (H)—VK meaning Volketten, 30 for weight, 30 tons, and (H) denotes a manufacturer. In this case the "H" means "Henschel."

Some designation layouts were different, like the VK XX or VK XXX (also called as Vs.Kfz. XX or Vs.Kfz. XXX). For example, the VK 31 (or Vs.Kfz. 31)—VK meaning Volketten (Vs. Kfz. meaning Versuchskampffahrzeug), and number "31" denotes its development years.

List of VK tanks

VK 6.01 - Panzer I Ausf. C
VK 9.01 - Panzer II Ausf. G
VK 9.03 - Panzer II Ausf. H and M
VK 13.03 - Panzer II Ausf. L "Luchs"
VK 13.05 - Flakpanzer Luchs
VK 16.01 - Panzer II Ausf. J
VK 16.02 - Leopard
VK 18.01 - Panzer I Ausf. F
VK 20.01-28.01 - designs for initially a 20-tonne tank to replace Panzer III and Panzer IV medium tanks.
VK 30 series - 30-35 tonne class tank designs.
VK 30.01 (H) -Henschel design for 30-tonne breakthrough tank, two prototypes built. Two hulls were later reused as Sturer Emil.
VK 30.01 (P) - Porsche design for 30-tonne tank. 
VK 30.01 (D) - Daimler-Benz design for a 30-tonne tank.
VK 30.02 (D) - Daimler-Benz design for a 30-tonne tank, initially ordered in 1942 but cancelled in favour of MAN design.
VK 30.02 (M) - MAN design for a 30-tonne tank, which evolved into the Panther tank.
VK 36.01 (H) - re-design of VK 30.01 (H) to incorporate more armour, 8 chassis including one complete vehicle.
VK 45.01 (H) - Henschel design accepted for production as Tiger I.
VK 45.01 (P) - Porsche's competing design to Henschel's VK 45.01 (H), chassis built to the design were rebuilt as Elefant self-propelled anti-tank guns.
VK 45.02 (H) - Tiger II prototype by Henschel.
VK 45.02 (P) - Tiger II design by Porsche as a competitor to the Henschel's VK 45.02 (H), not built.
VK 45.03 (H) - Henschel's "Tiger III".
VK 65.01 (H) - Henschel's heavy tank project.
VK 70.01-72.01 (K) - Panzer VII Löwe.
VK 100+ - Panzer VIII Maus proposed designs.
VK 31 - Leichttraktor.
VK 302 - Pz. Sfl. 1a.
VK 622 - Panzer IV Ausf. A.

See also
List of Sd.Kfz. designations
List of tanks of the United Kingdom#General Staff numbers

Notes

External links

Military vehicles of Germany
Armoured fighting vehicles of Germany
Germany